Col Christopher Wyndham Wilson JP DL known as “Kit” (1844 – 1918) was an English landowner, agricultural pioneer and appointed High Sheriff of Westmorland in 1884. He built two eponymous lakes in Westmorland: Kitmere and Wyndhamere.

Early life
Wilson was born 9 November 1844 at Rigmaden Park, Mansergh, Westmorland. He was the eldest son of William Wilson (1810–1880) and his wife Maria Letitia Hulme (1817–1873) and grandson of Christopher Wilson a businessman of Abbot Hall Kendal. His maternal grandmother Maria being the daughter of Colonel Wadham Wyndham. He succeeding to his father’s estates in 1880.

Later life
Wilson bred the Wilson  or Hackney pony a cross between the native fell pony and a thoroughbred Sir George. At this time he experimented in new agricultural techniques including fish farming on a series of lakes built on his lands and breeding shorthorn cattle. He was an early pioneer of electricity being the second homeowner in the UK to install electric light. An avid horseman Wilson served in the Yeomanry Cavalry becoming the Colonel of the Westmorland and Cumberland Yeomanry.

Family
Wilson married Mildred Eyre Spedding (1848–1878) of Mirehouse, Cumbria in 1874 and had one son Christopher Hulme Wilson (1875–1941), whose son Charles Eric Wilson was High Sheriff of Westmorland in 1962 and a daughter Beatrice b.1875 who worked for the British Information Services in New York during WWII. He married secondly Edith Townsend Farquhar in 1879 and had a further three sons and three daughters.

References

1844 births
1914 deaths
People from Westmorland
Agriculture in the United Kingdom
British agriculturalists
19th-century British farmers
20th-century British farmers